Treborth Botanic Garden (Welsh: Gardd Fotaneg Treborth), is a botanic garden in Wales, close to the city of Bangor, Gwynedd. It is owned by Bangor University, and is used in teaching for University students, local schools and community groups.  It is also open to the public without charge.

It is unusual in having within the garden a large area of native established broad-leaved woodland  bounded to the north by the seashore of the Menai Strait

History of the Garden

The current site was originally developed as a Victorian tourist destination, Britannia Park, by the Chester and Holyhead Railway Company in the 1840s. The grounds were designed by Sir Joseph Paxton, and features of his design can be see today, such as the lime avenue. However, due to a funding crisis the site was abandoned and reverted to pasture and woodland. Funding crises were to become a feature of the sites subsequent history.

In 1960, the then University College of North Wales (now Bangor University) bought the land with the aim of developing it into a collection of plants for the University's Department of Botany. When the Department of Botany closed, the Garden continued to be used by other departments within the University for teaching, in particular for environmental courses.

In recent years, Treborth Botanic Garden has come under threat of closure by Bangor University due to high maintenance costs, but this threat has been largely countered by the Friends of Treborth Botanic Garden, a volunteer group with charitable status that helps in the day-to-day running of the Garden, and the Students for Treborth Action Group (STAG), a Bangor University Students' Union society formed to safeguard the Garden for use by the students and population of Bangor.

Treborth Botanic Garden is twinned with Katse Botanical Gardens in Lesotho and has a special relationship with Xishuangbanna Tropical Botanical Garden in China.

Facilities and collections

Indoor

Treborth Botanic Garden has six glasshouses and a teaching laboratory with associated offices for the use of the curator and the volunteers in the main building complex. The Temperate Glasshouse features cacti, succulents, South African native plants and Canary Island native plants. The Tropical Glasshouse houses a variety of plants from the tropics including banana cultivars. The Orchid House and Bubble House contain the collections of orchids and carnivorous plants. Other glasshouses are used to house tender species from temperate zones, Welsh native flora, and for propagation and storage. The teaching lab doubles as a welcome area for visitors. A car park is situated outside the main building complex.

Outdoor

Away from the main buildings, Treborth features the largest rhizotron in Europe, a pigeon loft and meteorological recording equipment in a research compound . The garden has extensive outdoor grounds which extend all the way down to the shore of the Menai Strait. The grounds feature a half-acidic, half-basic rock garden, orchard and wildflower meadows alongside traditional outdoor planting. The majority of the grounds are woodlands designated as a Site of Special Scientific Interest.

As part of special 50th Anniversary celebrations, which  started with the annual musical fundraising festival Botanical Beats, a new wildlife pond was created and opened in June 2010.

Access to the public

The outdoor grounds are open to the public all year round. Treborth is one of the only botanic gardens in the United Kingdom that allows dogs, providing they are kept on a lead. The public are also allowed access to the glasshouses by appointment with the curator.

Access to the garden is by a long private road, which is the left turn directly before crossing the Menai Suspension Bridge Anglesey-bound.

A section of the Wales Coast Path passes through the coastal woodlands that form part of the Botanic garden.

See also

List of gardens in Wales

References

External links

Gardens in Wales
Bangor University